Bangalee is a rural locality in the Livingstone Shire, Queensland, Australia.

Geography 
Bangalee is a tiny strip of coastline on the Capricorn Coast comprising two streets of residential housing beside the beach. It is surrounded by the locality of Farnborough.

History
Between 2008 and 2013 Bangalee (and all of Shire of Livingstone) was within Rockhampton Region. In 2014, Shire of Livingstone was re-established.

References

Shire of Livingstone
Capricorn Coast
Localities in Queensland